Franco Vona (born 20 August 1964) is a former Italian racing cyclist. Vona won three stages of the Giro d'Italia and placed 6th overall in 1992. During the 1992 Tour de France he placed 2nd on the only two high mountain stages of the race and was inside the top 10 until the final ITT which dropped him to 11th. Later in his career he rode on the powerful Maglificio team of Patrick Lefevere and Roger De Vlaeminck and earned TTT stage victories in the 1993 and 1994 editions of the Tour de France.

Major results

1988
 1st Stage 16, Giro d'Italia
1989
 3rd Overall, Vuelta a Venezuela
 1st Stage 5
 3rd Stage 19, Giro d'Italia
 12th, Züri-Metzgete
1991
 1st Stage 6, Tour de Suisse
1992
 6th Overall, Giro d'Italia
 1st Stages 5 & 12
 11th Overall, Tour de France
 2nd Stages 13 & 14
1993
21st Overall, Tour de France
 1st Stage 4 (TTT)
1994
 16th, Liège–Bastogne–Liège
37th Overall, Tour de France
 1st Stage 3 (TTT)
1995
48th Overall, Tour de France

References

External links 

1964 births
Living people
Italian male cyclists
Italian Giro d'Italia stage winners
Sportspeople from the Province of Frosinone
Tour de Suisse stage winners
Cyclists from Lazio